"Dangerous" is a song by South African rock band Seether. It is their first single from their eighth studio album Si Vis Pacem, Para Bellum. It peaked at number one on the Billboard Mainstream Rock Songs chart in October 2020.

Background
The song was first released on 23 June 2020, at the same time as the band's announcement of the name and release date of their eighth studio album, Si Vis Pacem, Para Bellum on 28 August 2020. In just one week in July, the song had accumulated 1.9 million airplay audience impressions, 340,000 streams, and 1,000 downloads in the US. This, coupled with the release of a second promotional song, "Bruised and Bloodied", propelled writer and frontman Shaun Morgan to top the Billboard Hot Hard Rock Songs chart, only the second to top it since its creation in July 2020. In October 2020, the song had peaked at number one on the Billboard Mainstream Rock Songs chart.

Themes and composition
Morgan described the single as different from the rest of the album, but not so drastically different that it would upset the fanbase, and he felt that, along with his respective management and record label, that it would stand out at rock radio and make a good single as a result. The song was described as "despondent" and "beautifully tormented", containing lyrics such as "It's so dangerous, all this blamelessness / and I feel like I've lost all the good I've known / See hope fading out of your eyes / This time the pain is going to feel unreal." The song was described as "alternative metal anthem" and a slow burn building of a "rock jam".

Personnel
Seether
 Shaun Morgan – vocals, guitar, production
 Dale Stewart – bass
 Corey Lowery – guitar
 John Humphrey – drums, percussion

Additional personnel
 Matt Hyde – engineering, mixing

Charts

References

2020 songs
2020 singles
Seether songs
Songs written by Shaun Morgan